Guitar Rock was a 27-volume series issued by Time-Life during the mid-1990s, spotlighting rock music—in particular, hard rock, classic and album-oriented rock of the 1960s through early 1990s.

Much like Time-Life's other series chronicling popular music, volumes in the "Guitar Rock" series covered a specific time period, including two-year spans in some volumes and different parts of the decade (for instance, the early 1970s) in others. Each volume was issued on a compact disc or cassette. Except for two prototype volumes that preceded the series proper (where two CDs or two cassettes were issued in those particular volumes), individual volumes generally contained 18 tracks (this varied by one or two tracks per album), and represented the highlighted time period's most popular and noteworthy tracks. Also included was a booklet, containing liner notes written by some of the most respected historians of the genre, photographs of the artists, and information on the songs (writers, performers and peak position on Billboard magazine'''s Hot 100 and/or Album Rock Tracks charts).

History
"Guitar Rock" was first issued in 1993, although two "prototype" volumes that are considered to be part of the series were issued beforehand. Those albums were titled Guitar Rock (issued as a two-CD set in 1990) and Guitar Rock Monsters (1992, also as a two-CD set). The original Guitar Rock volume was the only one known to be available as a vinyl album. The first volume in the series proper was issued in the summer of 1993 and titled Guitar Rock: 1974-1975.

As was the case with Time-Life's other series, "Guitar Rock" was advertised in television and magazine advertisements. The series was available by subscription (by calling a 1-800 number); those who purchased the series in that fashion received a new volume roughly every other month (on the format of their choice), and had the option of keeping the volumes they wanted.

Each volume was also offered for individual sale. When the series was fully issued, a customer could purchase the entire series at once (or a group of albums, as packaged by Time-Life as part of a promotion), often at a discounted price.

New volumes continued to be issued through 1996, the final one being a volume covering rock from the first half of the 1990s. Two additional volumes, spotlighting power ballads and edgier pop music of the 1980s, were released in 1999.

Time-Life continued to offer "Guitar Rock" through the mid-2000s (decade), after which it was replaced by other series.

The series
As with many of Time-Life Records' multi-volume releases, the volumes were not issued in a logical, sequential order by date or era of the subject; that is, issuing volumes covering the 1960s before progressing to the 1970s. In the track information section, the volumes will be listed sequentially by era; the following list is the order in which the volumes were released.

1993
 Guitar Rock: 1974-1975"The Loco-Motion" - Grand Funk Railroad
"Slow Ride" - Foghat
"You Ain't Seen Nothin' Yet" - Bachman–Turner Overdrive
"Radar Love" - Golden Earring
"Love Hurts" - Nazareth
"I'm on Fire" - Dwight Twilley Band
"Must of Got Lost" - The J. Geils Band
"Welcome to My Nightmare" - Alice Cooper
"Jessica" - The Allman Brothers Band
"Rock and Roll, Hoochie Koo" - Rick Derringer
"Takin' Care of Business" - Bachman–Turner Overdrive
"Smokin' in the Boys Room" - Brownsville Station
"Sweet Home Alabama" - Lynyrd Skynyrd
"Take Me in Your Arms (Rock Me a Little While)" - The Doobie Brothers
"Can't Get Enough" - Bad Company
"Bad Time" - Grand Funk Railroad
"Free Bird" - Lynyrd Skynyrd
 Guitar Rock: 1978-1979"Hot Blooded" - Foreigner
"Hold the Line" - Toto
"Don't Look Back" - Boston
"Life's Been Good" - Joe Walsh
"Just What I Needed" - The Cars
"I Want You to Want Me" - Cheap Trick
"Yank Me, Crank Me" - Ted Nugent
"Sultans of Swing" - Dire Straits
"My Sharona" - The Knack
"Let's Go" - The Cars
"Don't Bring Me Down" - Electric Light Orchestra
"Bad Case of Loving You (Doctor, Doctor)" - Robert Palmer
"Surrender" - Cheap Trick
"One Way or Another" - Blondie
"Double Vision" - Foreigner
"In Thee" - Blue Öyster Cult
"Highway Song" - Blackfoot
 Guitar Rock: 1976-1977"Cold as Ice" - Foreigner
"Cat Scratch Fever" - Ted Nugent
"What's Your Name" - Lynyrd Skynyrd
"Arrested for Driving While Blind" - ZZ Top
"Caledonia" - Robin Trower
"(Don't Fear) The Reaper" - Blue Öyster Cult
"Sleepwalker" - The Kinks
"Heard It in a Love Song" - The Marshall Tucker Band
"Fooled Around and Fell in Love" - Elvin Bishop
"Feels Like the First Time" - Foreigner
"Do Ya" - Electric Light Orchestra
"Black Betty" - Ram Jam
"Drivin' Wheel" - Foghat
"Burnin' Sky" - Bad Company
"Show Me the Way" - Peter Frampton
"Long Time" - Boston
"Couldn't Get It Right" - Climax Blues Band
"So into You" - Atlanta Rhythm Section

1994
 Guitar Rock: 1980-1981"Call Me" - Blondie
"Shake It Up" - The Cars
"What I Like About You" - The Romantics
"Urgent" - Foreigner
"Keep On Loving You" - REO Speedwagon
"Love Stinks" - The J. Geils Band
"All Night Long" - Joe Walsh
"Cheap Sunglasses" - ZZ Top
"Tom Sawyer" - Rush
"Rock Brigade" - Def Leppard
"Hold On Loosely" - 38 Special
"Head Games" - Foreigner
"Tired of Toein' the Line" - Rocky Burnette
"Don't Misunderstand Me" - Rossington Collins Band
"Flirtin' with Disaster" - Molly Hatchet
"Take It on the Run" - REO Speedwagon
"(Ghost) Riders in the Sky" - Outlaws
"Winning" - Santana
 Guitar Rock: 1972-1973"Reelin' In the Years" - Steely Dan
"I'm Just a Singer (In a Rock and Roll Band)" - The Moody Blues
"Hocus Pocus" - Focus
"School's Out" - Alice Cooper
"We're an American Band" - Grand Funk Railroad
"Bang a Gong (Get It On)" - T. Rex
"Smoke on the Water" - Deep Purple
"China Grove" - The Doobie Brothers
"All the Young Dudes" - Mott the Hoople
"Saturday Night's Alright for Fighting" - Elton John
"Frankenstein" - The Edgar Winter Group
"Roundabout" - Yes
"Hold Your Head Up" - Argent
"Rocky Mountain Way" - Joe Walsh
"Ramblin' Man" - The Allman Brothers Band
"Run Run Run" - Jo Jo Gunne
"Iron Man - Black Sabbath
"Rock and Roll Part 2" - Gary Glitter
 Guitar Rock: 1970-1971"American Woman" - The Guess Who
"Oh Well, Part 1" - Fleetwood Mac
"Only You Know and I Know" - Dave Mason
"Fresh Air" - Quicksilver Messenger Service
"Truckin'" - Grateful Dead
"Comin' Home" - Delaney & Bonnie & Friends with Eric Clapton
"I'd Love to Change the World" - Ten Years After
"Black Magic Woman/Gypsy Queen" - Santana
"Spirit in the Sky" - Norman Greenbaum
"Green-Eyed Lady" - Sugarloaf
"The Rapper" - The Jaggerz
"I'm Eighteen" - Alice Cooper
"Footstompin' Music" - Grand Funk Railroad
"Mississippi Queen" - Mountain
"Black Night" - Deep Purple
"Funk #49" - James Gang
"Paranoid" - Black Sabbath
"D.O.A." - Bloodrock
 Guitar Rock: 1968-1969"Beck's Bolero" - Jeff Beck
"Born to Be Wild" - Steppenwolf
"Shape of Things to Come" - Max Frost and the Troopers
"No Time" - The Guess Who
"Living in the U.S.A." - Steve Miller Band
"Pictures of Matchstick Men" - Status Quo
"Hurdy Gurdy Man" - Donovan
"Evil Ways" - Santana
"Heartbreaker" - Grand Funk Railroad
"Kick Out the Jams" - MC5
"Summertime Blues" - Blue Cheer
"Journey to the Center of the Mind" - The Amboy Dukes
"Hot Smoke & Sassafras" - Bubble Puppy
"I Got a Line on You" - Spirit
"Who Do You Love?" - Quicksilver Messenger Service
"Hush" - Deep Purple
"In-A-Gadda-Da-Vida" - Iron Butterfly
"I'm Going Home" - Ten Years After
 Guitar Rock: The Mid-70's"Rebel Rebel" - David Bowie
"Free Ride" - The Edgar Winter Group
"Movin' On" - Bad Company
"La Grange" - ZZ Top
"Fool for the City" - Foghat
"Midnight Rider" - Gregg Allman
"Day of the Eagle" - Robin Trower
"Long Train Runnin'" - The Doobie Brothers
"Oh, Atlanta" - Little Feat
"Cum on Feel the Noize" - Slade
"Cherry Bomb" - The Runaways
"Saturday Night Special" - Lynyrd Skynyrd
"Walk Like a Man" - Grand Funk Railroad
"Jim Dandy" - Black Oak Arkansas
"Choo Choo Mama" - Ten Years After
"No More Mr. Nice Guy" - Alice Cooper
"Candy's Going Bad" - Golden Earring
"Do You Feel Like We Do" - Peter Frampton
 Guitar Rock: 1966-1967"I Fought the Law" - The Bobby Fuller Four
"Let's Live for Today" - The Grass Roots
"(We Ain't Got) Nothin' Yet" - Blues Magoos
"Kicks" - Paul Revere & the Raiders
"Wild Thing" - The Troggs
"Gloria" - The Shadows of Knight
"Dirty Water" - The Standells
"Little Girl" - Syndicate of Sound
"Sock It to Me-Baby!" - Mitch Ryder and the Detroit Wheels
"Hanky Panky" - Tommy James and the Shondells
"Blues' Theme" - Davie Allan and the Arrows
"7 and 7 Is" - Love
"Eight Miles High" - The Byrds
"Friday on My Mind" - The Easybeats
"Over Under Sideways Down" - The Yardbirds
"I Had Too Much to Dream (Last Night)" - The Electric Prunes
"Psychotic Reaction" - Count Five
"Don't Bring Me Down" - The Animals
"Pushin' Too Hard" - The Seeds
"Come On Up" - The Young Rascals
"You Keep Me Hangin' On" - Vanilla Fudge
 Guitar Rock: Classics"All Right Now" - Free
"Why Does Love Got to Be So Sad?" - Derek and the Dominos
"Easy Livin'" - Uriah Heep
"Whipping Post" - The Allman Brothers Band
"Woman from Tokyo" - Deep Purple
"Stone Cold Fever" - Humble Pie
"The House of the Rising Sun" - Frijid Pink
"Oye Como Va" - Santana
"Let It Rain" - Eric Clapton
"More Than a Feeling" - Boston
"Fame" - David Bowie
"Feel Like Makin' Love" - Bad Company
"(I Know) I'm Losing You" - Rod Stewart with Faces
"Rock and Roll All Nite" - Kiss
"Gimme Back My Bullets" - Lynyrd Skynyrd
"Rock You Like a Hurricane" - Scorpions
"Rock of Ages" - Def Leppard
 Guitar Rock: The Early 70's"Long Cool Woman in a Black Dress" - The Hollies
"Listen to the Music" - The Doobie Brothers
"I Hear You Knocking" - Dave Edmunds
"Evil Woman (Don't Play Your Games With Me)" - Crow
"Liar" - Three Dog Night
"Go Back" - Crabby Appleton
"Let's Work Together" - Canned Heat
"Casey Jones" - Grateful Dead
"Blue Sky" - The Allman Brothers Band
"Go All the Way" - Raspberries
"Walk Away" - James Gang
"Hey Lawdy Mama" - Steppenwolf
"Jesus Is Just Alright" - The Byrds
"Are You Ready?" - Pacific Gas & Electric
"Everybody's Everything" - Santana
"Hot Rod Lincoln" - Commander Cody and His Lost Planet Airmen
"Under My Wheels" - Alice Cooper
"Closer to Home" - Grand Funk Railroad
 Guitar Rock: The Late 60's"Hawaii Five-O" - The Ventures
"Magic Carpet Ride" - Steppenwolf
"Good Thing" - Paul Revere & the Raiders
"On the Road Again" - Canned Heat
"When I Was Young" - Eric Burdon and The Animals
"Jingo" - Santana
"Dark Eyed Woman" - Spirit
"Highway 61 Revisited" - Johnny Winter
"Time Has Come Today" - The Chambers Brothers
"So You Want to Be a Rock 'n' Roll Star" - The Byrds
"Incense and Peppermints" - Strawberry Alarm Clock
"Talk Talk" - The Music Machine
"Down on Me" - Big Brother and the Holding Company
"Season of the Witch" - Donovan
"Killing Floor" - The Electric Flag
"Kentucky Woman" - Deep Purple
"Morning Dew" - Jeff Beck
"Dear Mr. Fantasy" - Traffic
 Guitar Rock: The Early 80's"Centerfold" - The J. Geils Band
"Rock This Town" - Stray Cats
"Brass in Pocket (I'm Special)" - The Pretenders
"Juke Box Hero" - Foreigner
"Caught Up in You" - 38 Special
"Heat of the Moment" - Asia
"Edge of Seventeen" - Stevie Nicks
"Heart Like a Wheel" - Steve Miller Band
"Keep the Fire Burnin'" - REO Speedwagon
"Cum on Feel the Noize" - Quiet Riot
"Promises in the Dark" - Pat Benatar
"The Heart of Rock & Roll" - Huey Lewis and the News
"The Stroke" - Billy Squier
"I Can't Drive 55" - Sammy Hagar
"Bad to the Bone" - George Thorogood and the Destroyers
"Wango Tango" - Ted Nugent
"New World Man" - Rush

1995
 Guitar Rock: The Late 70's"Two Tickets to Paradise" - Eddie Money
"Dirty White Boy" - Foreigner
"Stone Blue" - Foghat
"Train, Train" - Blackfoot
"You Got That Right" - Lynyrd Skynyrd
"Raise a Little Hell" - Trooper
"A Man I'll Never Be" - Boston
"She's Not There" - Santana
"Dust in the Wind" - Kansas
"Calling Dr. Love" - Kiss
"Dream Police" - Cheap Trick
"Good Girls Don't" - The Knack
"Cruel to Be Kind" - Nick Lowe
"Don't Stop" - Fleetwood Mac
"Whiskey Man" - Molly Hatchet
"Free-for-All" - Ted Nugent
"R.U. Ready 2 Rock" - Blue Öyster Cult
"Roll with the Changes" - REO Speedwagon
 Guitar Rock: FM Classics"Crossroads" - Cream
"Revival (Love Is Everywhere)" - The Allman Brothers Band
"She Came In Through the Bathroom Window" - Joe Cocker
"Pinball Wizard" - Elton John
"Roll on Down the Highway" - Bachman–Turner Overdrive
"Gimme Three Steps" - Lynyrd Skynyrd
"30 Days in the Hole" - Humble Pie
"Fire and Water" - Free
"Rock 'n' Roll Stew" - Traffic
"Every Picture Tells a Story" - Rod Stewart
"Question" - The Moody Blues
"Tell Mama" - Savoy Brown
"Whisky Train" - Procol Harum
"Hair of the Dog" - Nazareth
"Shinin' On" - Grand Funk Railroad
"Man on the Silver Mountain" - Rainbow
"Christine Sixteen" - Kiss
 Guitar Rock: The Mid-70's: Take Two"Roll Over Beethoven" - Electric Light Orchestra
"The Joker" - Steve Miller Band
"Let It Ride" - Bachman–Turner Overdrive
"Billion Dollar Babies" - Alice Cooper featuring Donovan
"Straight Shootin' Woman" - Steppenwolf
"Good Lovin' Gone Bad" - Bad Company
"Give It To Me" - The J. Geils Band
"Some Kind of Wonderful" - Grand Funk Railroad
"Doctor Doctor" - UFO
"Rock On" - David Essex
"I Wanna Be with You" - Raspberries
"The Ballroom Blitz" - Sweet
"Never Been Any Reason" - Head East
"Must Be Love" - James Gang
"Hey Baby" - Ted Nugent
"Double Trouble" - Lynyrd Skynyrd
"Stormbringer" - Deep Purple
"Little Bit of Sympathy" - Robin Trower
 Guitar Rock: The Late 70's: Take Two"Long, Long Way from Home" - Foreigner
"Fly Like an Eagle" - Steve Miller Band
"Baby Hold On" - Eddie Money
"Peace of Mind" - Boston
"Rock 'n' Roll Fantasy" - Bad Company
"Godzilla" - Blue Öyster Cult
"Dog Eat Dog" - Ted Nugent
"Carry On Wayward Son" - Kansas
"Time For Me To Fly" - REO Speedwagon
"Red Hot" - Robert Gordon with Link Wray
"Rolene" - Moon Martin
"Starry Eyes" - The Records
"Cherry Baby" - Starz
"Roller" - April Wine
"Stone Cold Sober" - Crawler
"Take It Like A Man" - Bachman–Turner Overdrive
"Ain't That a Shame" - Cheap Trick
"Boom Boom (Out Go the Lights)" - Pat Travers
 Guitar Rock: The Heavy 80's"(You Gotta) Fight for Your Right (To Party!)" - Beastie Boys
"Talk Dirty to Me" - Poison
"The Warrior" - Scandal
"Tall Cool One" - Robert Plant
"Headed for a Heartbreak" - Winger
"Wait" - White Lion
"Give to Live" - Sammy Hagar
"Everybody Wants You" - Billy Squier
"Sister Christian" - Night Ranger
"Keep Your Hands to Yourself" - The Georgia Satellites
"Round and Round" - Ratt
"Here I Go Again" - Whitesnake
"You've Got Another Thing Comin'" - Judas Priest
"We're Not Gonna Take It" - Twisted Sister
"Ace of Spades" - Motörhead
"Twilight Zone" - Golden Earring
"Once Bitten, Twice Shy" - Great White
"Radioactive" - The Firm
 Guitar Rock: The Early 70's: Take Two"After Midnight" - Eric Clapton
"Ain't Wastin' Time No More" - The Allman Brothers Band
"High Time We Went" - Joe Cocker
"Elected" - Alice Cooper
"Hot 'n' Nasty" - Humble Pie
"Johnny B. Goode" - Johnny Winter
"Theme for an Imaginary Western" - Mountain
"1984" - Spirit
"Light Up or Leave Me Alone" - Traffic
"Maggie May" - Rod Stewart
"The Story in Your Eyes" - The Moody Blues
"Crazy Mama" - JJ Cale
"Going to the Country" - Steve Miller Band
"Keep Playin' That Rock and Roll" - Edgar Winter's White Trash
"The Stealer" - Free
"Lookin' for a Love" - The J. Geils Band
"No One to Depend On" - Santana
"Bell Bottom Blues" - Derek and the Dominos
 Guitar Rock: The 80's"Hit Me with Your Best Shot" - Pat Benatar
"Rock Me Tonite" - Billy Squier
"Stray Cat Strut" - Stray Cats
"Middle of the Road" - The Pretenders
"In a Big Country" - Big Country
"Peter Gunn" - Art of Noise featuring Duane Eddy
"Your Love Is Driving Me Crazy" - Sammy Hagar
"High On You" - Survivor
"Lunatic Fringe" - Red Rider
"Walk This Way" - Run–D.M.C.
"Some Like It Hot" - The Power Station
"Come Back" - The J. Geils Band
"I Want a New Drug" - Huey Lewis and the News
"Teacher, Teacher" - 38 Special
"Nothin' but a Good Time" - Poison
"Kiss Me Deadly" - Lita Ford
"Rock the Night" - Europe
"He Can't Love You" - Michael Stanley Band
 Guitar Rock: The Early 70's: The Hard Stuff"Ready for Love" - Bad Company
"I Just Want to Make Love to You" - Foghat
"Don't Ask Me No Questions" - Lynyrd Skynyrd
"Ride With Me" - Steppenwolf
"Going to Mexico" - Steve Miller Band
"Never in My Life" - Mountain
"Rock & Roll" - Detroit with Mitch Ryder
"Space Truckin'" - Deep Purple
"Midnight Man" - James Gang
"Gudbuy T'Jane" - Slade
"Be My Lover" - Alice Cooper
"Turn to Stone" - Joe Walsh
"Rockin' Down the Highway" - The Doobie Brothers
"Still Alive & Well" - Johnny Winter
"Easy Rider (Let the Wind Pay the Way)" - Iron Butterfly
"Queen of Torture" - Wishbone Ash
"Call Me the Breeze" - Lynyrd Skynyrd
"When Electricity Came to Arkansas" - Black Oak Arkansas

1996
 Guitar Rock: The Late 60's: Take Two"Rock Me" - Steppenwolf
"(I'm Not Your) Steppin' Stone" - Paul Revere & the Raiders
"One Track Mind" - The Knickerbockers
"Get Me To The World On Time" - The Electric Prunes
"Pride of Man" - Quicksilver Messenger Service
"This Wheel's on Fire" - The Byrds
"You Shook Me" - Jeff Beck
"Listen, Learn, Read On" - Deep Purple
"Baby, Please Don't Go" - The Amboy Dukes
"A Question of Temperature" - The Balloon Farm
"Space Cowboy" - Steve Miller Band
"Fresh-Garbage" - Spirit
"Blood of the Sun" - Leslie West
"Amphetamine Annie" - Canned Heat
"Persuasion" - Santana
"I Need a Man to Love" - Big Brother and the Holding Company
"Iron Butterfly Theme" - Iron Butterfly
"I Wanna Be Your Dog" - The Stooges
 Guitar Rock: Live! (a volume containing 11 live concert recordings)
"Slow Ride" - Foghat
"Cat Scratch Fever" - Ted Nugent
"Mississippi Queen" - Mountain
"Smoke on the Water" - Deep Purple
"I'm Eighteen" - Alice Cooper
"Rock and Roll, Hoochie Koo" - Rick Derringer
"I Want You to Want Me" - Cheap Trick
"Double Vision" - Foreigner
"Rocky Mountain Way" - Joe Walsh
"Godzilla" - Blue Öyster Cult
"Black Magic Woman/Gypsy Queen" - Santana
"Free Bird" - Lynyrd Skynyrd
 Guitar Rock: The 80's: Take Two"Working for the Weekend" - Loverboy
"My Kinda Lover" - Billy Squier
"Tuff Enuff" - The Fabulous Thunderbirds
"Goodbye to You" - Scandal
"Heartbreaker" - Pat Benatar
"Stone Cold" - Rainbow
"Lay It Down" - Ratt
"Burnin' for You" - Blue Öyster Cult
"Edge of a Broken Heart" - Vixen
"The Final Countdown" - Europe
"Still of the Night" - Whitesnake
"Don't Cry" - Asia
"Hey Baby" - Henry Lee Summer
"Alone Again" - Dokken
"Jungle Boy" - John Eddie
"I Want Action" - Poison
"Down Boys" - Warrant
"Nobody's Fool" - Cinderella
 Guitar Rock: The 90's"Kickstart My Heart" - Mötley Crüe
"Shelter Me" - Cinderella
"Shot of Poison" - Lita Ford
"The Ballad of Jayne" - L.A. Guns
"Wind of Change" - Scorpions
"Suicide Blonde" - INXS
"Can't Stop Fallin' Into Love" - Cheap Trick
"I Saw Red" - Warrant
"To Be with You" - Mr. Big
"Easy Come Easy Go" - Winger
"Lowdown and Dirty" - Foreigner
"The Deeper the Love" - Whitesnake
"High Enough" - Damn Yankees
"All She Wrote" - FireHouse
"Wicked Sensation" - Lynch Mob
"Chain of Fools" - Little Caesar
"I Remember You" - Skid Row

1999
 Guitar Rock: Power & Passion"We Built This City" - Starship
"Take Me Home Tonight" - Eddie Money
"Poison" - Alice Cooper
"Heaven in Your Eyes" - Loverboy
"I Want to Know What Love Is" - Foreigner
"Harden My Heart" - Quarterflash
"Can't Fight This Feeling" - REO Speedwagon
"When the Children Cry" - White Lion
"Rosanna" - Toto
"Missing You" - John Waite
"We're Ready" - Boston
"Love of a Lifetime" - FireHouse
"Second Chance" - 38 Special
"When I'm with You" - Sheriff
"Just Between You and Me" - April Wine
"When You Close Your Eyes" - Night Ranger
"Angel Eyes" - The Jeff Healey Band
"Price of Love" - Bad English
 Guitar Rock: Power Ballads''
"Nothing's Gonna Stop Us Now" - Starship
"The Search Is Over" - Survivor
"We Belong" - Pat Benatar
"Is This Love" - Whitesnake
"To Be with You" - Mr. Big
"I'd Do Anything for Love (But I Won't Do That)" - Meat Loaf
"Say You Will" - Foreigner
"When I See You Smile" - Bad English
"Amanda" - Boston
"Midnight Blue" - Lou Gramm
"Owner of a Lonely Heart" - Yes
"Carrie" - Europe
"High Enough" - Damn Yankees
"Every Rose Has Its Thorn" - Poison
"More Than Words Can Say" - Alias
"Waiting for a Girl Like You" - Foreigner
"Heaven" - Warrant
"Babe" - Styx

External links
 Time-Life Music official site – for a listing of current products
 Time-Life Album Discography, Part 26: Guitar Rock

Time–Life albums
Rock compilation albums